Borocera attenuata is a species of Lasiocampidae moth native to Madagascar. It was first described by George Hamilton Kenrick in 1914.

The males have a wingspan of 46 mm. Their head, palpi and the underside of the thorax are dull orange; antennaes, legs, thorax above and abdomen have a dark chestnut colour. The forewings are dark brown and the hindwings smoky brown.

References
 

Lasiocampidae
Lepidoptera of Madagascar
Moths described in 1914
Moths of Madagascar
Moths of Africa